Zvonko Pantović (Serbian Cyrillic: Звонко Пантовић), also known as Čipi (Chippie) (Serbian Cyrillic: Чипи), is a Serbian vocalist, best known as the lead singer and songwriter for the Serbian and former Yugoslav hard rock/heavy metal band, Osvajači, and Serbian rock/pop/folk band All Stars Osvajači.

Discography

With Osvajači

Studio albums
Krv i led (1991)
Sam (1995)

Compilations
The Best Of (1997)

With All Stars Osvajači

Studio albums
Vino crveno (1998)
Nevera (2000)
Crno oko (2002)

With Čipi i Industrija

Studio albums
Na Balkanu (2010)

References
EX YU ROCK enciklopedija 1960–2006, Janjatović Petar; 

Living people
Serbian rock singers
20th-century Serbian male singers
Yugoslav rock singers
Glam metal musicians
Serbian heavy metal musicians
1966 births
Serbian folk-pop singers
21st-century Serbian male singers
Beovizija contestants